The Cornwall County Football Association Senior Cup, commonly known as the Cornwall Senior Cup, is a knockout cup competition in English football for clubs based in Cornwall, run by and named after the Cornwall County Football Association. It is a County Cup competition involving clubs from the South West Peninsula League, East Cornwall League and Cornwall Combination.

As of the 2015–16 season, the competition is called the RGB Senior Cup for sponsorship reasons. The reigning champions are Falmouth Town, who defeated Saltash United 2-1 in the 2019 final to win the cup for the 12th time. It was Falmouth's first final appearance since 1997.

History
The competition was created in 1892 by the Cornwall County Football Association to provide a knockout tournament for the county's clubs. The inaugural tournament was won by Penzance in 1893. The competition did not take place between 1915 and 1919 due to the First World War, and again between 1939 and 1945 due to the Second World War. In previous years, clubs were grouped together in earlier rounds due to Cornwall's geography, with a runner-up match being played alongside the final. This was discontinued in 1978, with the Cornwall Junior Cup taking its place. Both matches are played on Easter Monday at a neutral venue.

Format
The Cornwall Senior Cup is contested by 52 clubs, as of the 2009–10 season, with seven rounds being played to decide the winner.

The preliminary round is made up of twenty-four clubs from the Cornwall Combination and East Cornwall League, played during the month of September. The first round is made up of the winners from the previous round and the clubs who received a bye, which takes place in October. The second round, played in December, is when clubs from the South West Peninsula League enter the competition, joining the eight winners from the previous round.

The third round is made up of sixteen teams, and the quarter-finals are made up of eight teams, with ties being played during the months of January and February respectively. The remaining clubs enter the semi-finals, which are played at a neutral venue in March, with the final being contested in April, again at a neutral venue.

Finals
This section lists every final of the competition played since 1893, the winners, the runners-up, and the result.

Key

1893–1912

1913–1932

1933–1952

1953–1972

1973–1992

1993–2012

2013–present

Table of winners

Sponsorship
 2012–13 The competition was known as the Westinsure Senior Cup
 2015– RGB Builders

References

External links
 Cornwall County Football Association
 Football Club History Database

County Cup competitions
Football in Cornwall
Recurring sporting events established in 1892